The office of Pantler of Scotland, (referred to in documents as ) was a court position in the Kingdom of Scotland during the High Middle Ages. The now historical term pantler or panter designated an officer responsible for the pantry or food supplies in general in a royal court.

Office holders
 Ailif
 Nicholas, the son of Ailif
 William St Clair of Roslin
 Henry St Clair of Roslin
 William Moray of Bothwell
 Sir Andrew de Moravia
 Sir John de Moravia, Lord of Bothwell
 Sir Thomas de Moravia, brother of the above, Lord of Bothwell
 Archibald the Grim, Lord of Galloway and Earl of Douglas
 Henry II Sinclair, Earl of Orkney

See also
Grand Panetier of France

References

Sources
Balfour Paul, Sir James, Scots Peerage IX vols. Edinburgh 1905. 
Fraser, Sir William. The Douglas Book 4 vols, Edinburgh, 1885.
Grose, Francis, The Antiquities of Scotland Vol II. London 1791. 

Great Officers of State of Scotland
Political office-holders in Scotland
Lists of Scottish people
Positions within the British Royal Household
Scotland in the High Middle Ages